Out on Film, Georgia's gay film festival in Atlanta, was established in 1987 and is one of the oldest gay film festivals in the United States devoted to the lesbian, gay, bisexual, and transgender community. The festival is now held in Midtown Atlanta in late September and early October to coincide with LGBT History Month and Atlanta Pride. Additional screenings and events are held throughout the year.

Out on Film is a non-profit all-gay and lesbian operated 501(c)(3) organization. Programming includes films by, for and about the LGBT community.

Films 
Out on Film programming is based on invitations to film makers to submit films for consideration. Annual submissions by, about, or of interest to the LGBT community are accepted for consideration, including dramas, comedies, foreign films, and shorts. In 2009 two films premiered at the festival, Rivers Wash Over Me and A Cross Burning at Willacoochee. In 2010, among the more than 50 films, the festival hosted the world premieres of Quentin Crisp: Final Encore, and Fishnet. In 2011 3 films had their premier.

Sponsors 
The non-profit festival relies solely on individual ticket sales, grants and the support of local, regional and national sponsors.

Festival Dates Shown Below

Awards and Recognitions
2019 Businessman of the Year, Jim Farmer, Festival Director, OUT Georgia Business Alliance.

Received grant from National Endowment for the Arts in 2020.

Designated as an Oscar qualifying festival from the Academy of Motion Picture Arts and Sciences in 2020

2020 Pivot of the Year, OUT Georgia Business Alliance.

See also 
 List of film festivals in North and Central America
 Atlanta Pride
 List of lesbian, gay, bisexual or transgender-related films
 Midtown Atlanta
 Atlanta

References

External links 
 www.outonfilm.org

Film festivals established in 1987
LGBT events in Georgia (U.S. state)
LGBT film festivals in the United States
1987 establishments in Georgia (U.S. state)
Film festivals in Georgia (U.S. state)
Festivals in Atlanta
LGBT culture in Atlanta